Sergei Aleksandrovich Zakharov (born 9 December 1984) is a former Russian professional football player.

Club career
He made his Russian Football National League debut for FC Metallurg Lipetsk on 14 May 2009 in a game against FC Salyut-Energiya Belgorod.

External links
 

1984 births
Sportspeople from Lipetsk
Living people
Russian footballers
FC Metallurg Lipetsk players
FC Gornyak Uchaly players
Association football midfielders
FC Lukhovitsy players
FC Sever Murmansk players